Guadua amplexifolia is a species of clumping bamboo native to Mexico, Panama, Costa Rica, Nicaragua, Colombia, and Venezuela.

This bamboo is used for construction.

References

amplexifolia
Grasses of North America
Grasses of South America
Flora of Colombia
Flora of Costa Rica
Flora of Panama
Flora of Venezuela
Grasses of Mexico
Flora of Southeastern Mexico
Flora of Southwestern Mexico
Flora of Veracruz